Against the Clock (formerly titled Headlock, also known as Transference) is a 2019 American thriller film directed by Mark Polish and starring Polish, Dianna Agron, Justin Bartha and Andy Garcia.

Cast
Mark Polish as Kelley Chandler
Dianna Agron as Tess Chandler
Andy Garcia as Gerald Hotchkiss
Justin Bartha as Peter Hobbs
James Frain as Dr. A
 Bar Paly as Lauren De Isigney

References

External links
 
 

2019 films
American thriller films
2019 thriller films
2010s English-language films
2010s American films